Enippadikal is a 1973 Indian Malayalam-language film, written and directed by  Thoppil Bhasi based on Thakazhi Sivasankara Pillai's novel of the same name. The film stars Madhu, Sharada, Jayabharathi and Kaviyoor Ponnamma in the lead roles. It is based on the novel of the same name by Thakazhi Sivasankara Pillai. Compositions by Travancore king Swathi Thirunal were also used in the film.

Plot

Cast 

Madhu
Sharada
Jayabharathi
Kaviyoor Ponnamma
KPAC Lalitha
Adoor Bhasi
Sankaradi
Adoor Pankajam
Alummoodan
Bahadoor
Anandavally
Jameela Malik
Kottarakkara Sreedharan Nair
S. P. Pillai
Beatrice

Soundtrack 
The music was composed by G. Devarajan and Swathi Thirunal and the lyrics were written by Vayalar, Swathi Thirunal, Jayadevar and Irayimman Thampi. Poems by Irayimman Thampi and verses from Jayadeva’s “Geetagovindam” included in the film were set to tune by Devarajan. The song "Praananaadhanenikku Nalkiya", despite its popularity, was banned by All India Radio for a while due to its explicit lyrics.

References

External links 
 

1970s Malayalam-language films
1973 films
Films based on Indian novels
Films directed by Thoppil Bhasi